The Canadian Radio Broadcasting Commission (CRBC), also referred to as the Canadian Radio Commission (CRC), was Canada's first public broadcaster and the immediate precursor to the Canadian Broadcasting Corporation.

Origins
The CRBC was established in 1932 by the government of R.B. Bennett based on the recommendations of the 1929 Royal Commission on Radio Broadcasting and as a result of the lobbying efforts of the Canadian Radio League. The network was created on May 26, 1932 and existed until November 2, 1936 when it was reorganized as a Crown corporation becoming the Canadian Broadcasting Corporation. Daily national broadcasting began in May 1933 with an hour's programming a day which was increased over time.

At its creation, Prime Minister Bennett spoke of the need for public control of radio saying:
 "This country must be assured of complete Canadian control of broadcasting from Canadian sources. Without such control, broadcasting can never be the agency by which national consciousness may be fostered and sustained and national unity still further strengthened."

The three-man commission had a mandate to regulate, control all broadcasting in Canada as well as to create and transmit its own programming and to lease, purchase or construct stations for its dissemination. Its ability to carry out its mandate was severely restricted by the financial constraints of the Great Depression and it was forced to rely on private stations to carry its programs to much of the country.

Bennett named Hector Charlesworth, editor of Saturday Night magazine, as chairman of the CRBC. The other members of the Commission were Thomas Maher, an unsuccessful Quebec Conservative candidate in 1930 federal election and director of a private radio station in Quebec City and Lieutenant Colonel William Arthur Steel (1890-1968) former Chief Radio Officer with the Canadian Corps during World War I.

Regulator
In addition to being a creator of programming and a broadcaster, the CRBC was responsible under the Canadian Radio Broadcasting Act for regulating and controlling all broadcasting in Canada, including privately owned radio stations that did not carry CRBC programming. The CRBC's regulatory responsibilities included determining the number, location and transmitting power of radio stations as well as the amount of time spent carrying local and national programming.

Operations
The CRBC acquired radio stations in Ottawa, Vancouver and Moncton from the CNR Radio network for $50,000 as well as CNR Radio studios in various other cities and leased or established additional stations in Montreal, Chicoutimi, Quebec City, Toronto and Windsor. The stations had been created in the 1920s by Canadian National Railways to provide broadcasting for railway passengers but were also heard by the general public and functioned, along with up two dozen stations across the country on which CNR Radio leased time, as an early national radio network. The CRBC also hired private stations across the country to carry at least three hours a day of CRBC programming. These affiliates were known as "basic stations". CRBC-owned or leased stations had the prefix "CRC" in their call-letters.

E. Austin Weir, formerly of the CNR radio network, became the CRBC's program director. He was terminated, however, for not providing enough programming. Weir was replaced by Ernie Bushnell who became director of CRBC programming in Ontario and Western Canada and Arthur Dupont who was responsible for Quebec and the Maritimes.

Programming
Network programming included orchestral music, live Metropolitan Opera radio broadcasts from NBC and New York Philharmonic Orchestra broadcasts from CBS, dramatized informational programs such as The Youngbloods of Beaver Band which serialized life on a western Canadian farm. One of the best known national drama series was Radio Theatre Guild produced in Montreal by Rupert Caplan. Under program director Ernie Bushnell, CRBC increased the number of weekly English language series being broadcast over the network to 17 by the time of the network's demise.

Another CRBC program, one which originated on the CNR's network in 1931, was Hockey Night in Canada under the names Saturday Night Hockey, General Motors Hockey Broadcast and then, starting in 1934, The Imperial Oil Hockey Broadcast. Other programming including fare such as Bible Dramas from CRCM Montreal, Canadian Press News - a 15-minute nightly newscast from CRCT Toronto presented by Charles Jennings (the father of Peter Jennings), Western Radio Players a weekly dramatic half-hour from CKY. Winnipeg

Northern Messenger, a weekly program originating from Toronto late Saturday nights but aimed at Canadians living in the far north including personal messages to RCMP officers, missionaries, trappers and others from family and friends, began in December 1933. The show was made up of listener letters, important messages from family and friends in other parts of the country, news and recorded music, and would run from November to May on CRBC's stations as well as several Canadian shortwave stations. During its first season, the program relayed 1,745 messages; a figure that increased sixfold within four years. The program would be continued by the CBC into the 1970s.

CRBC's national radio coverage of the 1935 federal election was the first time Canadian election results were broadcast nationwide.

All programs were live as there were no recording facilities. The network had six stations of its own and relied largely on private affiliates to provide studios, equipment and staff.

In April 1936, CRBC provided round the clock coverage of the Moose River Mine Disaster in Nova Scotia with announcer J. Frank Willis broadcasting live reports from the mine head every half hour for five days as rescue crews attempted to recover the lost miners. The reports were broadcast throughout Canada as well as to 650 stations in the United States and the BBC.

In July 1936, the network broadcast live coverage from France of the unveiling by King Edward VIII of the Canadian National Vimy Memorial, which was relayed across the ocean by shortwave radio.

The CRBC turned to radio advertising in order to make up a shortfall between government grants and the amount of money needed to run the network.

Demise
The network was criticized by the Canadian Radio League for having poor programming while the Liberal Party opposition accused the network of being biased towards the governing Conservatives.

During the election campaign, the CRBC broadcast a series of 15 minutes soap operas called Mr. Sage which were critical of Opposition leader William Lyon Mackenzie King and the Liberal Party. Decried as political propaganda, the incident was one factor in King's decision to replace the CRBC with a new entity when the Liberals took office following the election.

New legislation was introduced creating the Canadian Broadcasting Corporation as a crown corporation with an arm's length relationship with the government. The management of the CRBC, including Charlesworth, were dismissed and the new CBC was launched on November 2, 1936 with a new management team.

At its demise, the CRBC was made up of eight network owned-and-operated stations and 14 privately owned network affiliates.

The CRBC's regulatory powers were largely transferred to the CBC while the role of licensing stations and allocating wavelengths was assumed by the newly created Department of Transport. In 1958, the Board of Broadcast Governors assumed responsibilities for regulating public and private broadcasters from the CBC and the Department of Transport and in 1968, with the adoption of the Broadcasting Act, regulation became the responsibility of the Canadian Radio-television Commission (CRTC).

CRBC owned or leased basic stations
CRCA Moncton (closed October 31, 1933 due to plans to build more powerful transmitters at Sackville, New Brunswick. The new station was eventually opened by the CBC as CBA.)
CRCK Quebec City AM 1050 - now CBV-FM
CRCS Chicoutimi  AM 950 - now CBJ-FM
CRCM Montreal AM 910 - now CBME-FM
CRCO Ottawa AM 880 - now CBO-FM
CRCT Toronto AM 840 - (leased) - now CBLA-FM
CRCY Toronto AM 1030 and AM 1420 (leased) - now CJBC AM 860
CRCW Windsor AM 600 - now CBEW-FM
CRCV Vancouver AM 1100 - now CBU AM 690

All but the Moncton station later became CBC Radio or Radio Canada stations.

The CRBC also leased and operated shortwave radio station CRCX (formerly VE9GW) in Bowmanville, Ontario, broadcasting on 6095 kHz. The station was leased from Gooderham & Worts with Toronto station CRCT (formerly CKGW), which transmitted from the same Bowmanville site. CBC bought CRCX and CRCT from Gooderham & Worts in 1937, after leasing them for a year, but would close the shortwave station in 1938.

CRBC affiliates
CHNS Halifax
CHSJ Saint John
CHNC New Carlisle, Quebec
CKCH Hull (now defunct)
CFRC Kingston
CFPL London
CKY Winnipeg
CKCK Regina
CFQC Saskatoon
CKBI Prince Albert
CHAB Moose Jaw
CJCA Edmonton
CFAC Calgary
CHWK Chilliwack
CFCJ Kamloops
CKOV Kelowna
CJAT Trail

With the exception of CKY (now CBW, unrelated to today's CKY-FM), the remaining affiliates are no longer connected the CBC.

See also
 CNR Radio

References

External links
CRBC Programming
The Birth and Death of The Canadian Radio Broadcasting Commission - Canadian Communication Foundation

 
1932 establishments in Canada
1936 disestablishments in Canada
Public radio in Canada
Broadcasting authorities
Mass media regulation in Canada